Lamprophaia is a genus of moths of the family Crambidae.

Species
Lamprophaia albifimbrialis (Walker, 1866)
Lamprophaia mirabilis Caradja, 1925

References

Pyraustinae
Crambidae genera